The Church of Our Lady of Victory is a Roman Catholic parish church under the authority of the Roman Catholic Archdiocese of New York, located at Webster Avenue, Tremont, Bronx, New York City. The parish was established in 1909.

Buildings
The church complex consists of a church-and-school and separate rectory. The address is 1512 Webster Avenue, at East 171 Street, a block south of Claremont Parkway. The present dark brown brick Lombardo Romanesque-style church building dates from 1911, apparently providing for a parish school above; the parish does not currently have a parish school but offers a vigorous CCD program. The architect was John Vredenburgh Van Pelt, who designed the similar Guardian Angel Church (Manhattan) in 1930.

History
Reverend Bartholomew J. Galligan formed the parish and said the first mass in a temporary chapel on September 12, 1909. The church and school was opened on December 25, 1911 after construction was completed. The Reverend John F. Quinn was rector at this church until he was transferred to Holy Name of Mary (Montgomery, New York) in 1919 and replaced by the Rev. Thomas B. Brown.

Dedication
The church's "Victory" dedication is not clear, it is believed to celebrate the Battle of Lepanto (1571). 

There are at least two other Our Lady of Victory Roman Catholic churches in New York City:
 Brooklyn's appears to be the oldest, with the present church building, located at Throop Avenue and McDonough Street, Brooklyn, built 1891-1895 to the designs by Thomas E. Houghton. 
 Manhattan's is the most recent, being founded during World War II in 1944 by Francis Cardinal Spellman, Archbishop of New York and Apostolic Vicar for the U.S. Armed Forces; the present church was built 1944-1946 to the designs by the prominent New York City architectural firm of Eggers & Higgins

References 

Christian organizations established in 1909
Roman Catholic churches in the Bronx
Romanesque Revival church buildings in New York City
Tremont, Bronx